Laura Gonsalves Pamplona (born September 7, 1973, in Alicante) is a Spanish actress, best known for her roles in the television series Todos los hombres sois iguales (1996–1998), Policías, en el corazón de la calle (2000–2003), and Los misterios de Laura (2009–2014).

References 

1973 births
Living people
Spanish actresses
Actresses from the Valencian Community
20th-century Spanish actresses
21st-century Spanish actresses